Simona Flavia Malpezzi (born 22 August 1972) is an Italian politician. She was undersecretary of state for parliamentary relations in the Conte II and Draghi governments from 16 September 2019 to 25 March 2021. On 25 March 2021, she was unanimously elected leader of the Democratic Party in the Senate, succeeding Andrea Marcucci.

Early life 
She was born in Cernusco sul Naviglio and lives in Pioltello.

Political career 
She was elected to the Chamber of Deputies in the 2013 general election. She was elected to the Italian Senate in the 2018 general election.

See also 

 List of members of the Italian Chamber of Deputies, 2013–2018
 List of current Italian senators

References 

Living people
1972 births
Università Cattolica del Sacro Cuore alumni
20th-century Italian politicians
20th-century Italian women politicians
21st-century Italian politicians
21st-century Italian women politicians
Conte II Cabinet
Draghi Cabinet
Democratic Party (Italy) politicians
Deputies of Legislature XVII of Italy
Senators of Legislature XVIII of Italy
Women government ministers of Italy
Politicians from Milan
Women members of the Chamber of Deputies (Italy)
Women members of the Senate of the Republic (Italy)